Seattle is Perry Como's 17th 12" long-play album released by RCA Records. The title track was Como's first Top 40 single in four years; RCA wanted to issue an album featuring the hit single, so this album was compiled consisting mostly of unreleased material from recording sessions held during the previous three years. This was Como's first true attempt at a contemporary 1960s sound. The album's opening track, "Happiness Comes, Happiness Goes", features distorted guitars and swirling organs.

Track listing
Side one
"Happiness Comes, Happiness Goes" (Words and music by Al Stillman and Dick Manning)
"Nobody But You" (Words and music by Dion O'Brien)
"Seattle" (Music by Hugo Montenegro, and words by Ernie Sheldon and Jack Keller)
"Turnaround" (Words and music by Alan Green, Harry Belafonte and Malvina Reynolds)
"Beady Eyed Buzzard" (Words and music by Eddie Snyder and Richard Ahlert)
"Hearts Will Be Hearts" (Words and music by Cindy Walker)

Side Two
"That's All This Old World Needs" (Words and music by Bob Tubert and Demetriss Tapp)
"Together Forever" (Music by Harvey Schmidt and lyrics by Tom Jones)
"Sunshine Wine" (Words and music by Cindy Walker)
"Deep In Your Heart" (Words and music by Jan Crutchfield)
"Buongiorno Teresa" (Words and music by Dick Manning and Jimmy Lytell)

References

External links
Perry Como discography

Perry Como albums
1969 albums
Albums produced by Chet Atkins
RCA Victor albums